Paul Moran may refer to:
Paul Moran (English footballer) (born 1968), retired English football forward
Paul Moran (ice hockey) (born 1983), English ice hockey player
Paul Moran (musician), British Hammond organist, pianist, trumpeter for Van Morrison
Paul Moran (photojournalist) (1963–2003), first media person killed in the 2003 invasion of Iraq
Paul Moran (soccer) (born 1983), American soccer player